Matnah is a small village in Bani Matar District of Sanaa Governorate, Yemen. Located to the southeast of Jabal an-Nabi Shu'ayb, it serves as a stopping place on the road between Sanaa and al-Hudaydah.

History 
The earliest known mention of Matnah in historical sources is in 1275 (674 AH). It had a reservoir, mentioned in the Ghayat al-amani of Yahya ibn al-Husayn, as well as in a manuscript by Muhammad ibn Salah al-Sharafi.

References 

Villages in Sanaa Governorate